Timrå Municipality (Timrå kommun) is a municipality in Västernorrland County, Sweden. The town of Timrå is the municipal seat.

The rural municipality Timrå was made a market town (köping) in 1947. The present municipality was created in 1971 when Timrå was amalgamated with Hässjö.

Geography 

Timrå is located in a terrain of forest and hills. Traditionally the industry has been dominated by forestry. The timber was transported through the rivers and streams to their destination, most often to sawmills. In tribute to this, the city arms depicts trees and water.

Localities 
 Bergeforsen
 Stavreviken
 Söråker
 Sörberge
 Timrå (seat)

Notable citizens
Lennart Svedberg (1944-1972), ice hockey player
Magdalena Forsberg (1967), cross country skier, biathlete
Henrik Flyman, guitarist, composer, producer
Henrik Forsberg (1967), cross country skier

References

External links

Timrå - Official site

Municipalities of Västernorrland County